Peter Schwarz (born 14 June 1953) is a German former football player. He spent 10 seasons in the Bundesliga with 1. FC Kaiserslautern and Bayer Uerdingen.

Honours
 DFB-Pokal finalist: 1976.
 Bundesliga 3rd place: 1979, 1980.

External links
 

German footballers
1. FC Kaiserslautern players
KFC Uerdingen 05 players
1953 births
Living people
VfR Bürstadt players
Bundesliga players
Association football defenders